Graciema Junqueira da Luz (January 8, 1903 - February 25, 1983) was the second wife of the 19th President of Brazil, Carlos Luz, having served as the 20th First Lady of Brazil, from November 8, 1955, until November 11, 1955, the shortest presidential term in Brazilian history.

References 

1903 births
1983 deaths
People from Minas Gerais
Brazilian women in politics
First ladies of Brazil